The Palau International Coral Reef Center (PICRC) is a coral reef research center in Koror, Palau.

Administration
The research center is currently headed by Yimnang Golbuu.

Architecture
The center building features an aquarium, conference room, library, meeting rooms, gift shop etc.

References

External links

 

Coral reefs
Organizations based in Palau